The Byron Howes House (also known as the Howes-Graus House) is a historic house located at 718 Vermillion Street in Hastings, Minnesota.

Description and history 
The house was built in 1868 in the Italianate style by Byron Howes, an early resident of Hastings. The Italianate style was being popularized by Andrew Jackson Downing around the time. Byron Howes helped to establish two banks, one in Hastings and one in St. Paul. He also served as a deputy county treasurer and held other public offices in Hastings.

The house was later purchased by Wendel Graus, a businessman involved in hardware and lumber businesses. The house was listed on the National Register of Historic Places in 1978.

References

Buildings and structures in Hastings, Minnesota
Houses in Dakota County, Minnesota
Houses on the National Register of Historic Places in Minnesota
National Register of Historic Places in Dakota County, Minnesota
Italianate architecture in Minnesota